Mount Moriarty is a mountain on Vancouver Island, British Columbia, Canada, located  southwest of Parksville and  southeast of Mount Arrowsmith. It is named after William Moriarty who was first lieutenant on HMS Plumper on this coast from 1857 to 1861. It is a series of low domed summits at the head of the Cameron River, the Nanaimo River and the Englishman River.  Labour Day Lake lies to the south-west.

See also
 List of mountains of Canada

References

Vancouver Island Ranges
One-thousanders of British Columbia